Sumatra may refer to:
 Sumatra, an island in Indonesia
 Sumatra, a type of ornamental fish
 Sumatra chicken, a breed of chicken originally found on the island
 Sumatran coffee, a roast/variety of Arabica coffee
 Sumatra, Florida, a town in the United States
 Sumatra PDF, a Portable Document Format reader
 Sumatra (song), Song by Nora Van Elken
 , chartered by the Hudson's Bay Company from 1836–1838, see Hudson's Bay Company vessels

See also
 Sumatran - a native of Sumatra
 Sumatriptan - name of a drug